The 1973 Jacksonville State Gamecocks football team represented Jacksonville State University as a member of the Gulf South Conference (GSC) during the 1973 NCAA Division II football season. Led by fifth-year head coach Charley Pell, the Gamecocks compiled an overall record of 7–2 with a mark of 5–2 in conference play, and finished second in the GSC.

Schedule

References

Jacksonville State
Jacksonville State Gamecocks football seasons
Jacksonville State Gamecocks football